Brodie MacDonald (born September 11, 1989) is a former professional lacrosse goaltender who last played for the Vancouver Stealth of the National Lacrosse League. MacDonald was drafted in the second round (19th overall) in the 2010 National Lacrosse League entry draft by the Philadelphia Wings.

Statistics

NLL

References

1989 births
Living people
Canadian lacrosse players
Edmonton Rush players
Lacrosse people from British Columbia
Minnesota Swarm players
Georgia Swarm players
Sportspeople from Vernon, British Columbia